Snědovice is a municipality and village in Litoměřice District in the Ústí nad Labem Region of the Czech Republic. It has about 800 inhabitants.

Administrative parts
Villages of Bylochov, Křešov, Mošnice, Strachaly, Střížovice, Sukorady and Velký Hubenov are administrative parts of Snědovice.

References

Villages in Litoměřice District